847 Naval Air Squadron is a squadron of the Royal Navy Fleet Air Arm. It operates AgustaWestland Wildcat AH.1 helicopters and provides armed reconnaissance and light transport support to 3 Commando Brigade Royal Marines. Along with 845 and 846 naval air squadrons, it forms part of the Commando Helicopter Force. The squadron was re-formed from 3 Commando Brigade Air Squadron on 1 September 1995.

The unit is based at RNAS Yeovilton in Somerset, a Royal Naval establishment, with helicopters drawn from an Army Air Corps pool and flown by Royal Marines and Royal Navy aircrews.

Second World War
847 Naval Air Squadron was first formed at Lee-on-Solent on 1 June 1943, equipped with the Fairey Barracuda torpedo bomber. After working up, the squadron deployed aboard the aircraft carrier  in November 1943. Illustrious sailed for the Indian Ocean at the end of December, arriving at Colombo in Ceylon (now Sri Lanka) on 30 January 1944. On 19 April 1944, the squadron took part in Operation Cockpit, a raid by aircraft from Illustrious and the American carrier  against Sabang. The squadron took part in a raid by Illustriouss air wing against Port Blair on 19 June, but disbanded at Trincomalee in Ceylon on 30 June, its personnel and aircraft being absorbed into 810 Naval Air Squadron.

Post-war operations
The squadron reformed at RNAS Eglinton, near Derry in Northern Ireland, on 17 March 1956, equipped with three Fairey Gannet A.S.1 anti-submarine aircraft. It deployed to Nicosia in Cyprus on 8 April, with the role of carrying patrols to stop ships smuggling arms to insurgents during the Cyprus Emergency. The squadron received newer Gannet A.S.4s in June 1958, but returned to the United Kingdom in November 1959 after the end of the Emergency, disbanding at RNAS Yeovilton on 1 December 1959.

The squadron reformed again at RNAS Culdrose in the Commando (i.e. troop support) role, equipped with Westland Whirlwind HAS.7 helicopters. It was based at Sembawang in Singapore (known as HMS Simbang) from April 1964, briefly supplementing its Whirlwinds by a single Hiller Raven light helicopter in June, but disbanded on 2 December that year. The squadron reformed at Sembawang on 14 March 1969, being split off from 848 Naval Air Squadron and equipped with 10 Westland Wessex HU.5s helicopters. The squadron stood down on 22 May 1971.

Falklands War
847 Naval Air Squadron was reformed to take part in the Falklands campaign on 4 May 1982, operating 24 Westland Wessex HU.5 helicopters
 with Royal Naval personnel recruited mainly from RNAS Yeovilton. The aircraft were transported from the United Kingdom to the South Atlantic aboard RFA Engadine and the container vessel Atlantic Causeway.

Atlantic Causeway disembarked 12 Wessexes of 847 NAS on 1 June 1982, with the detachment from Engadine arriving on 9 June. The squadron's Wessexes, together with those of 845 NAS initially operated from San Carlos and provided much needed transport support to the advance of British forces on Port Stanley, with forward operating bases being set up at Teal Inlet and Fitzroy.  After the surrender of Argentine forces on the Falklands on 14 June 847 NAS relocated to Navy Point, a headland directly north of Port Stanley. 847 NAS remained in the Falklands until September 1982, providing air support to UK Forces.

847 NAS was one of the longest serving units to see action in the Falklands war, spending some 4 months on the islands in total, and leading some members of the squadron to refer to the unit as "84-who?" The squadron was disbanded on 24 September 1982.

1995 to the present
847 NAS reformed at RNAS Yeovilton with Royal Marines aircrews and REME engineers on 1 September 1995, from 3 Commando Brigade Air Squadron, as a tactical support unit for the Royal Marines Commandos with Westland Lynx AH.7 and Westland Gazelle AH.1 helicopters. The squadron has been active in Sierra Leone and in Kosovo.

The most significant deployment of recent years was to Operation Telic in Iraq in which it participated in the Battle of Basra. On 6 May 2006, one of the squadron's Lynxes, XZ614, was shot down over Basra in Iraq, by a surface-to-air missile (a Man Portable Air Defence System), killing 5 service personnel on board. Among the 5 killed were 847's commanding officer, Lieutenant Commander Darren Chapman; Wing Commander Coxen, who had been due to take command of the region's British helicopter forces, and Flight Lieutenant Sarah-Jayne Mulvihill; Coxen was the most senior British officer to die in the conflict and Mulvihill was the first British servicewoman to die in action in 22 years. This was the first British helicopter and only the second British aircraft downed (the first was an RAF Hercules) due to enemy fire, in the war. At the crash scene, British troops reportedly encountered rioting Iraqi civilians and were fired on by militia, while civilians were killed in the ensuing clashes. The crash led to a review of the vulnerability of helicopter transports in southern Iraq.

In 2005, the Gazelle reconnaissance helicopter was retired from service with the squadron.

Later, the Lynx AH.7s were replaced with the Lynx AH.9A variant, by the unit between May 2011 and Summer 2012.

From September 2008 the unit was deployed to Camp Bastion as part of Operation Herrick for a 7-month deployment supporting troops on the ground and aerial movements. The unit returned in January 2011 for 5 months and again during January 2013 for 5 months.

Current role
In late 2013, it became the first front-line military squadron to receive the AgustaWestland Wildcat AH.1, which enables the Squadron to continue providing Battlefield Reconnaissance as part of Commando Helicopter Force.

In June 2019 the squadron embarked on RFA Argus for a deployment to the Baltic Sea as part of the UK Joint Expeditionary Force. The squadron practised amphibious landings alongside the Merlins of 845 NAS as part of exercise Baltic Protector in the Baltic Sea.

Battle honours 
847 Naval Air Squadron has received the following battle honours:

 East Indies 1944
 Falklands 1982
 Iraq 2003

Notes

References

External links

847
Military units and formations of the United Kingdom in the Falklands War